ADB-FUBICA is a drug that acts as a potent agonist for the cannabinoid receptors, with EC50 values of 2.6 nM at CB1 and 3.0 nM at CB2.

See also 
 AB-FUBICA
 AB-FUBINACA
 ADB-FUBINACA
 ADB-FUBIATA

References 

Cannabinoids
Designer drugs
Fluoroarenes
Indolecarboxamides